Bangladeš is a small Romani suburban settlement of the city of Novi Sad, Serbia.

Name
The settlement's name is the Serbian transliteration of Bangladesh, a country in South Asia. The origin of the name is not certain.

History
Before being populated, Bangladeš was intended to be pig farmland. Bangladeš was founded in 1972 by the intervention of the Center for Social Work of Novi Sad to resettle 100 Roma families who were displaced after a great fire destroyed a Romani settlement in Novi Sad. It was intended to be temporary. However, the settlement essentially became permanent. The settlement's households received potable pipeline water supply in 2004 and electricity in 2009.

Geography
The settlement is situated to the northwest of urban Novi Sad, between Sajlovo and Rumenka, close to the road connecting the two settlements, Rumenački put (Rumenka road).

Demographics
According to ACT International, Bangladeš was populated by 250 ethnic Romani people, of which 40 were children, in 2000. According to Red Cross Novi Sad, Bangladeš was populated by 233 inhabitants, who lived in 55 families, in 2006. It had been reported that in 2009 the settlement had 350 inhabitants in 60 households.

See also
 Neighborhoods of Novi Sad
 List of Roma settlements

References

External links
 Center for Social Work of Novi Sad

Suburbs of Novi Sad
Romani communities in Serbia